The LNB Pro A Finals MVP is an annual basketball award that is given by the top-tier level league in France, the LNB Pro A. It is awarded to the player that is chosen as the most valuable player of the league's playoff's finals, of a given LNB Pro A season.

Winners

See also
LNB Pro A MVP
LNB Pro A Awards

References

LNB Pro A awards
European basketball awards
Basketball most valuable player awards